Bilston Town Hall is a municipal facility in Church Street, Bilston, West Midlands, United Kingdom. It is a Grade II listed building.

History
The building was commissioned to replace an earlier timber-framed town hall in Lichfield Street. The foundation stone for the new building was laid by Edward Pugh, treasurer of the local board of health, on 2 April 1872. The new building, which was designed by architects Bidlake and Lovatt of Wolverhampton in the Classical style and built by a Mr Nelson from Dudley at a cost of £6,000, was officially opened on 14 June 1873. An extension incorporating a larger free library and a new reading room in the same architectural style as the original building was added in 1880.

The ball room on the first floor was, in 1910, leased to Joseph Woods as a cinema: after he built Wood's Palace, on the other side of the road, the ballroom reverted to community use. The town hall became the meeting place of Bilston Urban District Council in 1894 and of the Bilston Municipal Borough Council in 1933. The Princess Royal visited Bilston Town Hall in 1946 shortly after the Second World War.

The town hall ceased to be the local seat of government when Bilston was incorporated into the new county Borough of Wolverhampton in 1966. However, the town hall continued to be used by the housing department of Wolverhampton Metropolitan Borough Council for another 30 years until it closed in 1996.

In April 2005, work started on a refurbishment programme for the building involving restoration of the grand ballroom for use by the Gazebo Theatre Company, new offices for Wolverhampton Homes, repairs to the roof, stonework, windows and clock and a new glass entrance. The venue also took possession of a newly restored pipe organ, designed and built by John Compton, which had been removed from the Lyric Cinema in Wellingborough in Northamptonshire when it changed ownership in the late 1960s and had instead been installed at Weavers Road School in Wellingborough. Although it had been used for concerts at the school in the 1980s, it had subsequently languished in the school for many years until it was acquired for Bilston Town Hall in 2007. Following the completion of the works, which cost £2.5 million, the town hall was officially reopened by Councillor Christine Mills, the Mayor of Wolverhampton, on 19 September 2008. 

In 2013 the town hall also became the central hub of "Talent Match Black Country", an organisation which provides support to young unemployed people in the local area.

References

Buildings and structures in Wolverhampton
Government buildings completed in 1873
City and town halls in the West Midlands (county)
Grade II listed buildings in the West Midlands (county)